Cheesman is a surname, meaning a maker or seller of cheese. Notable people with the surname include:

Barry Cheesman, American professional golfer
Clive Cheesman, an officer of arms at the College of Arms in London
Edith Cheesman (1877–1964), British artist
Georgie Cheesman, British architect, better known by her married name of Georgie Wolton
Ernest Entwistle Cheesman (1898–1983), English botanist specialising in Musaceae
Evelyn Cheesman, British entomologist and explorer
Darren Cheesman, an English field hockey player
Jenny Cheesman, former Australian women's basketball player and captain
Linda Cheesman, American bodybuilder and figure competitor
Paul R. Cheesman (1921–1991), American archeologist and a professor of religion at Brigham Young University.
Robert Ernest Cheesman (1878-1962), British military officer, explorer and ornithologist
Thomas Cheesman (cricketer) (1816–1874), English cricketer
Walter Cheesman (1838–1907), American capitalist: railroad, real estate, water, mining
Wendy Cheesman, British architect and founding member of Team 4. Also known by her married name of Wendy Foster

See also
Cheesman's Gerbil, a gerbil of the Arabian Peninsula
Cheesman Park, an urban park in Denver, Colorado
Cheeseman
Cheeseman the Game

English-language surnames
Occupational surnames
English-language occupational surnames